The National People's Congress Foreign Affairs Committee is one of nine special committees of the National People's Congress (NPC), the national legislature of the People's Republic of China. The special committee was created during the first session of the 6th National People's Congress in June 1983, and has existed for every National People's Congress since.

Composed of a chairman, a number of vice-chairmen, and several members, the Foreign Affairs Committee is responsible for reviewing and deliberating on proposed legislation regarding foreign affairs including the signing or abrogation of treaties and agreements with other nations for delivery to the NPC, reviewing and replying to inquiries submitted by the NPC regarding foreign affairs, communicate with foreign counterparts, make statements for major issues related to Chinese foreign affairs, present briefings to relevant departments on international issues, and all other tasks given it by the National People's Congress.

Membership

References

Foreign Affairs Committee
Parliamentary committees on Foreign Affairs